Scarsella may refer to:

Surname
It is an Italian surname. Notable people with the surname include:
Basil Scarsella (born 1955), Australian businessman
Fabio Scarsella (born 1989), Italian footballer
Ippolito Scarsella (1550/1551–1620), also known as Scarsellino, Italian painter
Les Scarsella (1913–1958), American baseball player

Architecture
Scarsella, an architectural element

See also
Scarcella

Italian-language surnames